Kuhigan-e Bala (also Romanized as Kūhīgān-e Bālā; also known as Kūhegān, Kūhegān-e Bālā, and Kūhīkān) is a village in Damen Rural District, in the Central District of Iranshahr County, Sistan and Baluchestan Province, Iran. At the 2006 census, its population was 196, in 46 families.

References 

Populated places in Iranshahr County